"Colours of Your Love" is a song recorded by Austrian singer Conchita Wurst for her debut album, Conchita (2015). It was released as a double A-side single along with "Firestorm" on 7 August 2015.

Track listing
Digital download
 "Firestorm" – 3:43
 "Colours of Your Love" – 3:34

Charts

References

2014 songs
2015 singles
Conchita Wurst songs
Songs written by Joacim Persson
Songs written by Cyndi Almouzni